Vevo (an abbreviation for "Video Evolution", stylized in all caps until 2013) is an American multinational video hosting service, best known for providing music videos to YouTube. The service is also available as an app on selected smart TVs, digital video recorders, digital media players and streaming television services. The service once offered a consumer mobile and tablet app, however this was shut down in May 2018 to allow the service to focus on its other platforms.

The service was concluded after negotiations on June 16, 2009, as a joint venture among three major record companies: Universal Music Group (UMG), Sony Music Entertainment (SME) and shortly before its launch by EMI. In August 2016, Warner Music Group (WMG), the world's third-largest record company, agreed to license premium videos from its artists to Vevo.

Initially, the service hosted only music videos from Universal Music Group and Sony Music Entertainment, syndicated on YouTube and its app, and the advertising revenue was shared by Google and Vevo. Originally, Warner Music Group was reported to be considering hosting its content on the service after it launched, but formed an alliance with rival MTV Networks (now Paramount Media Networks). In August 2015, Vevo expressed renewed interest in licensing music from WMG and a deal with WMG was completed on August 2, 2016, making again the entirety of the "big three" record companies' music available on Vevo.

History

The concept for Vevo was described as being a streaming service for music videos (similar to the Hulu streaming service for movies and TV shows after they air), with the goal being to attract more high-end advertisers. The site's other revenue sources include a merchandise store and referral links to purchase viewed songs on Amazon Music and iTunes. UMG acquired the domain name vevo.com on November 20, 2008. SME reached a deal to add its content to the site in June 2009. The site went live on December 8, 2009, and later that same month became the number one most visited music site in the United States, overtaking Myspace Music. Upon Vevo's launch, many YouTube videos added by Vevo over the course of the year had their views inflated. In early 2013, these views were subtracted from various Vevo channels, most notably Lady Gaga's Vevo channel. The affected videos include the "Just Dance" video, which lost more than half of its existing views. Other affected videos include "Heartless" and "Toxic", whose graphs showed similar traces of inflation.

In June 2012, Vevo launched its Certified awards, which honors artists with at least 100 million video views on Vevo and its partners (including YouTube) through special features on the Vevo website.

In 2017, Vevo announced in a brief online statement the departure of Erik Huggers as the company's president and CEO and his replacement by CFO Alan Price as the interim CEO.

In April 2018, Vevo's YouTube channel was hacked by two hackers using the name of Prosox and Kuroi'SH and caused the renaming of many videos and the deletion of the most viewed YouTube video, "Despacito" by Luis Fonsi.

On May 24, 2018, Vevo announced that it was shutting down its consumer website and removing its app from mobile platforms, so that it could focus on YouTube syndication. However, Vevo is still available through various apps and devices including YouTube, DVRs, smart TVs, gaming consoles and streaming devices such as Roku. In October 2020, it was announced that Vevo partnered with Netherlands-based music video service Xite.

Vevo TV
On March 15, 2013, Vevo launched Vevo TV, an Internet television channel running 24 hours a day, featuring blocks of music videos and specials. The channel was only available to viewers in North America and Germany, with geographical IP address blocking being used to enforce the restriction. Vevo had planned launches in other countries. After revamping its website, Vevo TV later branched off into three separate networks: Hits, Flow (hip hop and R&B), and Nashville (country music). Vevo shut down the service during the first half of 2016 as part of a site-wide redesign.

Vevo TV ran on an automated schedule, similar to video-exclusive networks run by Viacom Media Networks. Music videos would play twice within an hour and original programming, such as Top 10 Now and Vevo Lift, would air several times per day. After rebranding in 2016, Vevo TV was slowly phased out. Vevo's mobile app continued to run the channel until they were relaunched later that year.

Availability
Vevo was available in Australia, Brazil, Canada, France, Germany, Ireland, Italy, Mexico, the Netherlands, New Zealand, Poland, the Philippines, Spain, the United Kingdom and the United States. The website was scheduled to go worldwide in 2010, but as of March 23, 2018, it was still not available outside these countries.  Vevo's official blog cited licensing issues for the delay in the worldwide rollout. Most of Vevo's videos on YouTube are viewable by users in other countries, while others will produce the message "The uploader has not made this video available in your country."

The Vevo service in the United Kingdom and Ireland was launched on April 26, 2011. On April 16, 2012, Vevo was launched in Australia and New Zealand by MCM Entertainment. On August 14, 2012, Brazil became the first Latin American country to have the service. It was expected to be launched in six more European and Latin American countries in 2012. Vevo launched in Spain, Italy, and France on November 15, 2012. Vevo launched in the Netherlands on April 3, 2013, and on May 17, 2013, also in Poland. On September 29, 2013, Vevo updated its iOS application that now includes launching in Germany. On April 30, 2014, Vevo was launched in Mexico.

Vevo is also available for a range of platforms including Android, iOS, Windows Phone, Windows 8, Fire OS, Google TV, Apple TV, Boxee, Roku, Xbox 360, PlayStation 3, and PlayStation 4.

In May 2018, Vevo announced that it would be discontinuing its consumer website and app on mobile platforms in order to focus on YouTube syndication. However, Vevo is still available through various apps and devices including YouTube, DVRs, smart TVs, gaming consoles and streaming devices such as Roku.

Edited content
Versions of videos on Vevo with explicit content such as profanity may be edited, according to a company spokesperson, "to keep everything clean for broadcast, 'the MTV version. This allows Vevo to make their network more friendly to advertising partners such as McDonald's. Vevo has stated that it does not have specific policies or a list of words that are forbidden. Some explicit videos are provided with intact versions in addition to the edited version. There is no formal rating system in place, aside from classifying videos as explicit or non-explicit, but discussions are taking place to create a rating system that allows both users and advertisers to choose the level of profanity they are willing to accept.

24-Hour Vevo Record

The 24-Hour Vevo Record, commonly referred to as the Vevo Record, is the record for the most views a music video associated with Vevo has received within 24 hours of its release. The video that currently holds this record is Taylor Swift's "Me!" with 65.2 million views.

In 2012, Nicki Minaj's "Stupid Hoe" became one of the first Vevo music videos to receive a significant amount of media attention upon its release day, during which it accumulated around 4.8 million views. The record has consistently been kept track of by Vevo ever since. Total views of a video are counted from across all of Vevo's platforms, including YouTube, Yahoo! and other syndication partners. On April 14, 2013, Psy's "Gentleman" unofficially broke the record by reaching 38.4 million views in its first 24 hours. However, this record was not acknowledged by Vevo because it was not associated with them until four days after its release to YouTube.

On August 19, 2014, Minaj broke the record with her "Anaconda" video which garnered 19.7 million views. Swift broke the record with "Bad Blood" with 20.1 million views, on May 17, 2015, which was later surpassed by Adele's "Hello", which received 27.7 million views in first 24 hours.

On August 28, 2017, both YouTube and Vevo records were eclipsed by Swift again, with "Look What You Made Me Do", which gained 43.2 million views in 24 hours. On December 1, 2018, Ariana Grande's "Thank U, Next" broke the record, accumulating 55.4 million views in 24 hours. Swift then regained the record on April 27, 2019, when her video for "Me!" garnered 65.2 million views in first 24 hours. Swift's channel is the first and only to break the record three times. One Direction, Justin Bieber, Nicki Minaj and Miley Cyrus, have all broken the record twice (Minaj would have tied Swift if features were included in the count).

Record holders

List of Vevo videos which held the record for most views in their first 24 hours online

Vevo Certified Award

Vevo Certified Award honors artists with over 100 million views on Vevo and its partners (including YouTube) through special features on the Vevo website. It was launched in June 2012.

Artists with the most Vevo Certified videos
Top 30 artists with the most Vevo Certified music videos. All lead and co-lead appearances are counted towards the artists' total. Featured appearances are not counted.

See also
 Music on demand
 Digital media certification
 List of most-viewed YouTube videos
 List of most-viewed online videos in the first 24 hours

References

External links
 Official website

Advertising video on demand
Google services
Internet properties established in 2009
American music websites
Sony Music
Universal Music Group
Warner Music Group
YouTube
Multi-channel networks
PlayStation 4 software